Michael Weiner (born 17 June 1949) is a professor of East Asian history and international studies and is the director of international studies at Soka University of America (SUA).  Previously, he was  professor and chair of Asian studies at San Diego State University.  He received his B.A. from Sophia University in Tokyo, and his Ph.D. from University of Sheffield, England.

Positions held
Michael Weiner taught at University of Sheffield from 1984 to 2000.  He was a lecturer from 1984 to 1988, a senior lecturer from 1989 to 1994, and a reader from 1995 to 2000.  He assumed the position of professor and chair of Asian studies at San Diego State University from 2000 to 2005.  He became professor of East Asian history and international studies as well as director of international studies at SUA in 2005.

Research
Weiner's research interests include eugenics and social policy in modern Japan, global migration, and minority rights in Japan, among others. Following is a list of his publications:

 The Comintern and International Communism, 1919–1943, Macmillan, 1996, pp. 158–190.
 "Destination Japan: Migration in the twentieth century," specially commissioned article for the inaugural issue of Pan-Japan; The International Journal of the Japanese Diaspora, Spring, 2000, pp. 49–74.
 "Discourses of Race and Nation in Pre-1945 Japan," Ethnic and Racial Studies, Vol. 18, No 3, July 1995, pp 433–56.
 The Internationalization of Japan, Routledge, 1993
 "Japan in the Age of Migration," in M. Douglass and G. Roberts, eds., Japan and Global Migration: Foreign workers and the advent of a multicultural society, Routledge, 2003, pp. 52–70
 Japan's Minorities; the illusion of homogeneity, Routledge, 1997
 Origins of the Korean Community in Japan, Humanities Press, 1989
 "Out of the Very Stone; Korean hibakusha," Immigrants and Minorities, Vol. 14, No 1, April 1995, pp 2–25.
 Race and Migration in Imperial Japan, Routledge, 1994
 Race, Ethnicity and Migration in Modern Japan (3 volumes), Routledge, 2005

Honors and awards
 Reischauer Fellowship, Harvard University, 1991–1992
 ESRC Fellow, 1997–2000
 Managing Editor, Japan Forum 1995-2000
 Director, Japan Studies Institute, 2000–2005

External links
Michael Weiner, Ph.D. Faculty Page
faculty.soka.edu Page

Nationality missing
Historians of Japan
Alumni of the University of Sheffield
Academics of the University of Sheffield
San Diego State University faculty
Harvard Fellows
1949 births
Living people
Historians of Asia
Place of birth missing (living people)
Sophia University alumni